Modesto López Novoa (born 21 January 1965), known simply as Modesto, is a Spanish former professional footballer who played as a centre back.

Career

Modesto was born in Ourense, capital of the province of the same name, in the autonomous community of Galicia, and began his career with CD Ourense. He made his debut in 1983, and was part of the team that earned promotion from the Tercera División in 1984–85. He left the club in 1986, joining fellow Galicians Deportivo La Coruña in the Segunda División. He stayed with Depor for four and a half seasons, leaving in the January transfer window of the 1990–91 season, at the end of which Deportivo were promoted. He then signed for a third Galician club, Compostela, who were then in Segunda División B. In Modesto's first season, they earned promotion via the play-offs.

Modesto was still an important part of the Compostela side when they won a second promotion, again via a play-off, in 1993–94, reaching La Liga for the first time in their history. Modesto made his top flight debut in the exalted surroundings of Santiago Bernabéu Stadium against giants Real Madrid on 23rd October 1994, and helped Compostela earn an unexpected 1–1 draw. He ultimately played 21 matches in the top division that season, but left at the end of the year to rejoin Ourense. His second stint at his hometown club lasted four seasons, during which time he experienced the highs of promotion to the Segunda División in 1995–96, and relegation back again in 1998–99. He retired in 1999 at the age of 34.

Honours
Deportivo la Coruña
Segunda División runners-up: 1990–91

Career statistics

1. Appearances in the 1991 Segunda División B play-offs
2. Appearance in the 1993–94 Segunda División promotion play-off
3. Appearances in the 1996 Segunda División B play-offs

References

External links

1965 births
Living people
Footballers from Ourense
Spanish footballers
Association football defenders
La Liga players
Segunda División players
Segunda División B players
Tercera División players
CD Ourense footballers
Deportivo de La Coruña players
SD Compostela footballers